Clarkville is a small rural town in the Waimakariri District, New Zealand.

History
Clarkville was originally known as Kaiapoi Island, because it was in between two equally large branches of the Waimakariri River. This led to the area being flooded often by the unpredictable Waimakariri River. In the 1860s, farmers cut a new course for the river and choked the north branch, rendering it just a stream, known today as Silverstream, of which the Silverstream Estate (where Mitre 10 Dream Home 2013 was located) was named after. In 1880, the name was changed to Clarkville, in honour of Joseph Clark, who donated land for the local school.
In 1919, The Clarkville Hall Association, Incorporated, erected a community hall. It is called the Clarkville Peace Hall, and still stands today, along with an enlargement in 1970.

Education
Clarkville School is Clarkville's only school, and was established in  1874. It is a decile 9 state co-educational full primary, with  students (as of

Demographics

Clarkville had a population of 1,401 at the 2018 New Zealand census, an increase of 81 people (6.1%) since the 2013 census, and an increase of 279 people (24.9%) since the 2006 census. There were 471 households. There were 723 males and 675 females, giving a sex ratio of 1.07 males per female. The median age was 46.1 years (compared with 37.4 years nationally), with 264 people (18.8%) aged under 15 years, 225 (16.1%) aged 15 to 29, 681 (48.6%) aged 30 to 64, and 231 (16.5%) aged 65 or older.

Ethnicities were 92.9% European/Pākehā, 7.9% Māori, 1.3% Pacific peoples, 3.2% Asian, and 1.5% other ethnicities (totals add to more than 100% since people could identify with multiple ethnicities).

The proportion of people born overseas was 14.1%, compared with 27.1% nationally.

Although some people objected to giving their religion, 52.2% had no religion, 39.2% were Christian, 0.2% were Muslim, 0.6% were Buddhist and 0.9% had other religions.

Of those at least 15 years old, 222 (19.5%) people had a bachelor or higher degree, and 171 (15.0%) people had no formal qualifications. The median income was $40,900, compared with $31,800 nationally. The employment status of those at least 15 was that 591 (52.0%) people were employed full-time, 243 (21.4%) were part-time, and 24 (2.1%) were unemployed.

Climate
The average temperature in summer is 16.6 °C, and in winter is 6.4 °C.

References

Waimakariri District
Populated places in Canterbury, New Zealand